Martha's Vineyard Transit Authority (VTA) is a bus transportation system serving Martha's Vineyard, Massachusetts. In addition to diesel buses, it has 12 electric buses charged at several points. The Edgartown facility has 700 kW solar panels and a 1.5 MWh battery adding to the bus power.

Fares 
All bus routes accept cash. During the peak time of year (June 10 - October 1), The One Town fare is $2.00, and another $2.00 is added for each consecutive town. The rest of the year (off-peak), the One Town fare is $1.25, adding another $1.25 for each consecutive town. 1, 3, 7, 31 day, 100 day, as well as 365 day passes (annual) are available for purchase. Discounted fares are also available for seniors over age 65, disabled people, and military veterans. Routes 10 and 11 connect Park and Rides to city centers and so are both free.

Routes

1: Edgartown-Vineyard Haven Road
2: Vineyard Haven - West Tisbury via Lambert's Cove & Old County Roads
3: West Tisbury - Vineyard Haven via State Road 
4: West Tisbury - Chilmark - Menemsha via North Road
5: West Tisbury - Chilmark - Aquinnah via South Road
6: Edgartown - Airport - West Tisbury
7: Oak Bluffs - Airport  via County & Barnes Roads
8: South Beach
9: Oak Bluffs - Hospital - Airport via Barnes Road & County Road
10: Tisbury Park & Ride
10A: West Chop Loop
11: Downtown Edgartown
12: Chilmark In-Town\ Menemsha Sunset Bus
13: Edgartown - Oak Bluffs - Vineyard Haven via Beach Road

Ridership

The annual ridership in the fiscal year of 2018 was 1,347,337. 

 The busiest bus route is #13, (512,914 as of CY2019) which experiences high levels of ridership during peak hours.
 The busiest bus route during the off-peak season is #1.
 Route #8 has a seasonal ridership of 26,520, far above all the seasonal routes, because of the beaches that it serves that are popular in the summer.

References

External links
Marth's Vineyard Transit Authority
Massachusetts Department of Transportation, VTA Profile

Bus transportation in Massachusetts
Martha's Vineyard
State agencies of Massachusetts
Tourist attractions in Edgartown, Massachusetts